Extended theories of gravity are alternative theories of gravity developed from the exact starting points investigated first by Albert Einstein and Hilbert. These are theories describing gravity, which are metric theory, "a linear connection" or related affine theories, or metric-affine gravitation theory. Rather than trying to discover correct calculations for the matter side of the Einstein field equations; which include inflation, dark energy, dark matter, large-scale structure, and possibly quantum gravity; it is proposed, instead, to change the gravitational side of the equation.

Proposed theories

Hernández et al. 

One such theory is also an extension to general relativity and Newton's Universal gravity law, first proposed in 2010 by the Mexican astronomers Xavier Hernández Doring, Sergio Mendoza Ramos et al., researchers at the Astronomy Institute, at the National Autonomous University of Mexico. This theory is in accordance with observations of kinematics of the solar system, extended binary stars, and all types of galaxies and galactic groups and clouds. It also reproduces the gravitational lensing effect without the need of postulating dark matter.

There is some evidence that it could also explain the dark energy phenomena and give a solution to the initial conditions problem.

These results can be classified as a metric f(R) gravity theory, more properly an f(R,T) theory, derived from an action principle. This approach to solve the dark matter problem takes into account the Tully–Fisher relation as an empirical law that applies always at scales larger than the Milgrom radius.

See also
 Modified Newtonian Dynamics
 Alternatives to general relativity

References

Further reading

External links
 Sergio Mendoza's web page

News
 El universal.com .
 La jornada.mx .
 La crónica.com .

Theories of gravity
General relativity